Hanle (also spelt Anle) is a large historic village in the Indian union territory of Ladakh. It is the site of the 17th century Hanle Monastery (gompa) of the Drukpa Kagyu branch of Tibetan Buddhism. Hanle is located in the Hanle River valley on an old branch of the ancient Ladakh–Tibet trade route. More recently, Hanle is the home of Hanle observatory, one of the world's highest sites for astronomical observation.

Geography

Hanle is in the valley of the Hanle River, which originates near the Imis La pass [5.290m or 17,355ft high saddle, south of Ukdungle Indian Military base, Zarsar & Tradole peak] on the India-Tibet border and joins the Indus river near Nowi and Loma north of Hanle village, close to the town of Nyoma. A road running through the Hanle valley from Loma is the quickest way to reach Hanle from Chushul and Pangong Tso side. In 2012, the road terminated near Hanle (see "Transport" section for new road connectivity), the traditional trade and pilgrimage corridor formerly ran up the Hanle valley to Imis La, crossed into the Indus valley via Charding La near Demchok and Dêmqog, and proceeded to Tashigang in Tibet. This traditional trade route to Tibet is now closed.

Hanle is also connected to Koyul river valley to the east via a winding mountain road that passes through the Photi La pass.

Demographics
The valley is home to approximately two thousand people, of whom about 300 people are living in Hanle village.

History 
To the west of this frontier were the highlands of Rupshu and, beyond it, Zanskar.

Sengge Namgyal built the prominent Hanle monastery in association with Tatsang Repa (Stag-tsang-ras-pa), the notable Buddhist priest of the Drukpa ("red hat") sect. Sengge Namgyal died here in 1642 after his return from an expedition against the Mongols who had occupied the Tibetan province of Tsang and were threatening Ladakh's possessions in Tibet.

Hanle Observatory 
Hanle is home to the Indian Astronomical Observatory.  The location of the village and the observatory are highly sensitive due to the close proximity of the Tibetan / Chinese border. Special permission is needed to visit either by the Indian Government. 

India set up the Himalayan Chandra Telescope, a 2m gamma ray telescope at Hanle. The Major Atmospheric Cerenkov Experiment Telescope (MACE), which is under construction in Hanle, will be the world's highest Cerenkov telescope and the second largest Cerenkov telescope in the world. It was originally scheduled to become operational by 2016, but plans were pushed back to begin operations in 2020.

Wildlife 
Hanle is an important area for wild animals. It harbours the only population of the Tibetan gazelle in Ladakh.  The wetlands in the Hanle basin teem with migratory birds including Bar-headed Goose and the Black-necked Crane. One can easily see scores of Tibetan wild ass grazing on the sedge-meadows along the Hanle River.

Transport 

Nyoma Air Base in northwest and Fukche Air Base in east are 74 km & 24 km away respectively, and Ukdungle town is in South. Hanle is important stopover from mainland India to Ukdungle, Chumar sector and Demchok sector.

Hanle-Kaza-Tabo Road is being constructed by the BRO under Indo-China Border Roads (ICBR) scheme.

See also

 Demchok sector
 Geography of Ladakh

References

Citations

Sources

External links

 Hanle Travel Info

Villages in Nyoma tehsil